Shaun Evans (born 14 September 1996) is a Welsh rugby union player who plays for United Rugby Championship team Scarlets as a hooker.

Professional career 
Evans played school rugby for Coleg Sir Gâr, and made his debut for the Carmarthen Quins in March 2015, establishing himself as a first team regular by the 2015–16 season. Evans earned a call-up to the Wales U20 squad for the 2016 Six Nations Under 20s Championship, where he scored three tries in five games as Wales won their first Grand Slam at this level. He earned another call-up for the 2016 World Rugby Under 20 Championship, where he made a further three appearances.

Evans earned his first professional contract with the Scarlets in 2016. Evans played for the Scarlets development side in the British and Irish Cup prior to making his competitive debut. On 14 April 2018, Evans made his full debut for the Scarlets, against Edinburgh.

In 2019, Evans underwent a positional change, moving from flanker to hooker. Evans joined Nottingham R.F.C. on loan in March 2021, along with fellow Scarlets Harri O'Connor and Jac Price. Evans made eight appearances for the side, scoring one try.

References

External links 
Scarlets profile
ItsRugby profile

1996 births
Living people
Rugby union players from Carmarthen
Scarlets players
Welsh rugby union players
Rugby union flankers
Rugby union hookers
Nottingham R.F.C. players